By Bizarre Hands Rides Again is a collection of short stories and two novellas written by American author Joe R. Lansdale. It is a re-issue of his first short story collection with a new introduction, four additional stories, illustrations, and a different cover. It is limited to 300 numbered copies and 26 lettered editions with a custom leather slipcase.

Table of contents
New introduction by Joe R. Lansdale
Original introduction by Lewis Shiner
Morning, Noon, and Night (new story)
Fish Night
The Pit
Duck Hunt
By Bizarre Hands
The Steel Valentine 
I Tell you It's Love
Letters From the South, Two Moons West of Nacogdoches
Boys Will be Boys
The Fat Man and the Elephant
Hell Through a Windshield
Down by the Sea Near the Great Big Rock
Trains Not taken
Tight Little Stitches in a Dead Man's Back
The Windstorm Passes
Night They Missed the Horror Show
On the Far Side of the Cadillac Desert With Dead Folks (novella)
Starlight, Eye Bright (new story)
Not From Detroit (additional story)
King of Shadows (additional novella)

References

External links
 Author's Official website

2010 short story collections
Short story collections by Joe R. Lansdale
Horror short story collections